Blackwater Integrated College is an 11-16 secondary school on a restricted site with about 230 pupils though with the capacity for twice as many. Mr S Taylor is the school's current principal.

History and future proposals
Blackwater Integrated College opened in September 2008. It was formed as a merger of Down Academy and Rowallane Integrated College. Down Academy had been formed when Killyleagh,  Castlewellan, and  Quoile  High  Schools amalgamated in 1991. Down Academy became a controlled integrated school in 1998. The Blackwater site was chosen for its central location.

In 2019 Blackwater was one of 22 school with sustainability issues with too few pupils to remain financially viable. The centre of school population is closer to Belfast, and additional capacity is needed to support students who failed to get a place at Lagan College.

A period of consultation on the school's future ended 3 June 2021. With the support of the college, a new integrated college with an admission number of 100 will be opened on a different site Mid Down Integrated College on 1 September 2023 and Blackwater Integrated College will close on or shortly after 31 August 2023.

Academics
The school is small so a single child can distort the statistic. It fares well in inspections, and its year 12 results were above average for two of the last three reported years.

See also
 List of integrated schools in Northern Ireland
 List of secondary schools in Northern Ireland
 Education in Northern Ireland

References

External links
Blackwater Integrated College Website
NICIE website

Integrated schools in County Down
Secondary schools in County Down